The Libytheinae are a nymphalid subfamily known as snout butterflies, containing two valid genera and about ten species: six in Libythea and four in Libytheana. The common name refers to the thick labial palps (pedipalps) that look like a "snout" in this subfamily. In older literature, this group was recognized as the family Libytheidae. They are medium-sized and typically a drab brown. The front legs are reduced in length and the ventral hindwings are cryptically colored to help them blend in with their surroundings. While at rest, the members of this subfamily keep their wings tightly closed to resemble dead leaves.

Classification 
Libytheinae is a subfamily of the family Nymphalidae:

Family Nymphalidae Rafinesque, 1815
 Subfamily Libytheinae Boisduval, 1833
 Libythea Fabricius, 1807
 Libytheana Michener, 1943

References 

 Freitas, A. V. L., & Brown, K. S., Jr. (2004). Phylogeny of the Nymphalidae (Lepidoptera). Systematic Biology 53(3):363-383.
 Kawahara, A. Y. (2003). Rediscovery of Libythea collenettei Poulton & Riley (Nymphalidae: Libytheinae) in the Marquesas, and a description of the male. Journal of the Lepidopterists' Society 57:81-85.
 Shields, O. (1984). A revised, annotated checklist of world Libytheidae. Journal for Research on the Lepidoptera 22: 264-266.

External links
 Tree of Life: Libytheinae
 Libytheinae at Markku Savela's Lepidoptera and Some Other Life Forms

 
-
Butterfly subfamilies